Caroline Roose (born 10 November 1968 in Ostend) is a Belgian politician who is active in France and has been serving as a Member of the European Parliament since 2019. She is a member of Europe Ecology – The Greens (EELV).  She is a belgian national but has been living in Villeneuve-Loubet since her early childhood.

Political career
In parliament, Roose has since been serving on the Committee on Regional Development (since 2019) and the Committee on Fisheries (since 2020). In 2020, she also joined the Committee of Inquiry on the Protection of Animals during Transport.

In addition to her committee assignments, Roose is part of the Parliament's delegations to the ACP–EU Joint Parliamentary Assembly.  She is also a supporter of the MEP Alliance for Mental Health and a member of the European Parliament Intergroup on the Welfare and Conservation of Animals and the European Parliament Intergroup on Western Sahara.

Political positions
Ahead of the Green movement's primaries in 2021, Roose endorsed Yannick Jadot as the movement's candidate for the French presidential election in 2022.

References

1968 births
Living people
MEPs for France 2019–2024
21st-century women MEPs for France
People from Alpes-Maritimes